The Scottish Science Advisory Council is a government organisation that is Scotland's highest level advisory body for science, engineering and technology.

The group of experts provide independent advice to the Scottish Government. Members are appointed by the Cabinet Secretary for Education and Lifelong Learning.
It acts in an advisory role and does not direct any research funding, which comes from the UK Research Councils.

History
Scotland has a proud tradition of science research and innovation, but this tends to be exclusively found in its main universities. R&D in Scottish industry is lower than the rest of the UK (RUK). Scotland has 10% of the population of the UK but produces 30% of the PhDs in microbiology and genetics. The University of Dundee is noted for its work in biochemistry.

However, in physical sciences, from 1999 to 2004, there was a 12% drop in Scottish graduates, and a 17% drop in engineering and technology graduates. In the post-war years, and up to the early 1990s, Scotland was producing more than its fair share of science and engineering graduates; it was seen a popular and challenging option, although mainly among males. Now, proportionately more children at Scottish schools are perceived to be indifferent to the challenges that science presents. Older science teachers at Scottish schools are not being replaced in the number needed. Why Science Matters, the 2003 report, found that Scotland was short of around 350 chemistry teachers and 200 physics teachers.

The organisation was announced in August 2001, and founded by the Royal Society of Edinburgh, with funding from the Scottish Executive.

From 1 January 2007, it moved to the Office of the Chief Scientific Adviser. Previously it had been at the Royal Society of Edinburgh.

See also
 Scottish Science Trust
 Chief Scientific Adviser for Scotland
 Scottish Council for Development and Industry
 Campaign for Science and Engineering

References

External links
 

2002 establishments in Scotland
Government agencies established in 2002
Organisations based in Edinburgh
Organisations supported by the Scottish Government
Research and development in the United Kingdom
Royal Society of Edinburgh
Science and technology in Scotland
Science education in the United Kingdom
Scientific organisations based in the United Kingdom
Scientific organizations established in 2002